Richard Bowyer (by 1527 – 1558/59), of Arundel, Sussex, was an English politician.

He was a Member (MP) of the Parliament of England for Arundel in November 1554.

References

1550s deaths
English MPs 1554–1555
People from Arundel
Year of birth uncertain